Opanin "Opi" Osafo-Adjei Edwards (born 30 April 1999) is a Ghanaian footballer.

Club career

Bristol City
Edwards made his senior debut for Bristol City playing 90 minutes in a 3–0 loss at Watford in the FA Cup.

Edwards made his league debut for the club on 28 November 2020, coming off of the bench in the 86 minute of a 3–1 away defeat at Reading.

Forest Green Rovers
On 21 June 2021, Edwards agreed a deal to join Forest Green Rovers on a free transfer on a one-year deal following his release from Bristol City.

Rochester New York FC
On 2 September 2022, Edwards signed a deal to join MLS Next Pro club Rochester New York FC. Two days later, he made his debut for the club, coming off the bench in a 2-1 win against Philadelphia Union II.

Personal life
He is the older brother of fellow footballer Owura Edwards.

Career statistics

References

1999 births
Living people
Ghanaian footballers
English footballers
Ghanaian emigrants to England
Association football midfielders
English Football League players
National League (English football) players
Bristol City F.C. players
Bath City F.C. players
Solihull Moors F.C. players
Torquay United F.C. players
Forest Green Rovers F.C. players
Black British sportspeople
MLS Next Pro players